Alastair Galpin (born 1974, East London, South Africa) 
is the 2nd biggest Guinness World Records breaker of the 2000s decade, breaking 38 World Records, behind Ashrita Furman. He immigrated to New Zealand in 2002, and says that his career in Record Breaking was inspired when he met champion rally driver, Simon Evans, in Kenya in 1998.

World records

Alastair Galpin has broken over 85 world records for feats including having the most snails on the face (eight in 10 seconds) and the most rubber-bands stretched over the face (62 in one minute). He also holds the most stamps licked (57 in one minute), loudest clap, and the fastest time to peel and eat three kiwifruit.

Galpin is also the holder of the Guinness World Record for the most hugs in one hour in Civic Square, Wellington, New Zealand on 13 July 2007 (624 hugs) and achieved three new Guinness World Records at the Guinness World Records Day 2009 for Champagne-cork spitting, coin blowing, and Malteser (malt ball) spitting.

Along with New Zealander Don Purdon, Galpin commenced an attempt at the longest hand-shake at 8 pm EST on Friday 14 January 2011 in New York Times Square. After 33 hours, three minutes, they had smashed the existing record by more than 17 hours and shared the record with Nepalese brothers Rohit and Santosh Timilsina.

Charitable awareness raising

Galpin seeks to raise awareness – and sometimes raise funds – for social and environmental causes. He uses various methods to spread knowledge of environmental issues, including referring to issues of global concern in his website's stories, and during his motivational storytelling in schools.

His opinion piece, titled 'Human Application of Consciousness' – while not directly related to world record-breaking, explains Galpin's drive to contribute to the struggle for a truly sustainable future for mankind and other life on earth. He does so by collaborating with non-profits and organisations on projects of varying degrees of social and environmental importance.

Among his more noteworthy charitable efforts are the greatest height to drop gambling machines as a statement against gambling harm, the largest bowl of soup (shared) to show healthy eating in disadvantaged communities, and the most radio interviews in a suspended cage to bring media attention to the issue of problem gambling.

Unusual feats

His activities were played down by some US websites covering "most ridiculous" and "least impressive" world records and he has also attracted US television coverage for similar reasons. Among other print media, The Citizen has featured his work.

References

External links
 Official website of Alastair Galpin
 It's Auckland Cranes & The Caged Alastair Galpin (Scoop)

Living people
1974 births
World record holders